The Mattequartier is a historic section in the Old City of Bern in Bern, Switzerland.

The first expansion of Bern occurred as the city was founded in 1191.  The central and oldest neighbourhood was known as the Zähringerstadt (Zähringer town) after the founder, Duke Berthold V of Zähringen.  While the Zähringerstadt grew, the area below the Zähringerstadt along the banks of the Aare river developed into the Mattequartier.

Situated in the southeast of the Aare peninsula, the Mattequartier, together with the Nydegg, constitute medieval Bern's smallest neighbourhoods. Workshops and mercantile activity prevailed in this area, and medieval sources tell of numerous complaints about the ceaseless and apparently nerve-wracking noise of machinery, carts and commerce. The Matte area at the riverside features three artificial channels, through which Aare water was diverted to power three city-owned watermills built in 1360.  In the early 20th century, a small hydroelectric plant was built in that location. Nearby, the busy Schiffländte (ship landing-place) allowed for the reloading of goods transported by boat up and down the river.

References

Old City (Bern)